Lipaphis is a genus of aphids of the family Aphididae.

Species include:

Lipaphis alliariae 
Lipaphis berteroaella 
Lipaphis cochleariae 
Lipaphis erysimi 
Lipaphis fritzmuelleri 
Lipaphis lepidii 
Lipaphis rossi 
Lipaphis ruderalis 
Lipaphis sisymbrii 
Lipaphis turritella

References

Further reading
 

Sternorrhyncha genera
Macrosiphini